Dave Heinbuch (born 31 January 1955) is a Canadian former swimmer. He competed in the men's 200 metre breaststroke at the 1976 Summer Olympics.

References

External links
 

1955 births
Living people
Canadian male swimmers
Olympic swimmers of Canada
Swimmers at the 1976 Summer Olympics
Sportspeople from Kitchener, Ontario
Pan American Games silver medalists for Canada
Pan American Games medalists in swimming
Swimmers at the 1975 Pan American Games
Medalists at the 1975 Pan American Games
20th-century Canadian people
21st-century Canadian people